The Housing Act 2004 (c 34) is an Act of the Parliament of the United Kingdom.  It introduced Home Information Packs, which have since been abandoned. It also significantly extends the regulation of houses in multiple occupation by requiring some HMOs to be licensed by local authorities. Finally, it provides the legal framework for tenancy deposit schemes, which are intended to ensure good practice regarding deposits in assured shorthold tenancies and make dispute resolution relating to them easier.

The Act introduced the Housing health and safety rating system (HHSRS). This made the owners or landlords of buildings responsible for assessing risks to health and safety, and removing these. In the assessment of Stuart Hodkinson, 'While appearing stronger on paper, the new laws have in practice served to reduce hugely the enforcement powers available to regulatory bodies. The HHSRS effectively abolished the previous minimum legal fitness standard for rented housing in England, replacing a black-and-white "pass/fail" approach  with a more flexible set of standards not always backed by statutory obligation and open to greater interpretation by landlords and local authority enforcement teams, based on the assessment of risks'.

See also

Empty dwelling management orders, created by the Act

References

External links
The Housing Act 2004, as amended from the National Archives.
The Housing Act 2004, as originally enacted from the National Archives.
Explanatory notes to the Housing Act 2004.
records of Parliamentary debate relating to the Act from Hansard, at theyworkforyou.com

United Kingdom Acts of Parliament 2004
Housing legislation in the United Kingdom